A'ou (阿欧方言) or Red Gelao (红仡佬语) is an endangered Gelao language spoken by fewer than 100 people in Guizhou, China. Only the Hongfeng (红丰) and Bigong (比贡) dialects are still spoken, each with only a few dozen speakers.

Dialects
The main dialects of A'ou, which all have limited mutual intelligibility, are:
Hongfeng (红丰)
Bigong (比贡)
Qiaoshang (桥上) (extinct)

Only one elderly speaker of the Houzitian (猴子田) dialect was found in 2013, and it is likely now extinct.

Mulao (木佬) is sometimes also included, in addition to Yi (羿), an extinct A'ou variety of Sichuan.

References

Kra languages
Languages of China